Mantilla-class patrol vessels are offshore patrol vessels in use by the Argentine Coast Guard since 1983.

Description 

The class was developed by the Spanish company Empresa Nacional Bazán in 1982. It is a multi-role patrol craft with twin funnels and a helicopter deck. These ships have main armament (40 mm L70 DP gun) at B position. Ships of the Mantilla class were the first vessels of the Argentine Coast Guard able to operate on board helicopters (AS.365 Dauphin or AS.350 Écureuil).

Starting 2014 the ships of the class undergone a modernization program at Tandanor which will extend its operating life for 30 years

Ships 
  (1982)
  (1982)
  (1983)
  (1983)
  (1983)

Gallery

See also 
 
 Sinking of Chian-der 3

References

Notes

Bibliography 
 Faulkner, K. (1999) Jane's Warship Recognition Guide. 2nd Edition. London: Harper Collins Publishers.
 Friedman, N. (1997) The Naval Institute Guide to World Naval Weapons Systems, 1997-1998. US Naval Institute Press.
 Wertheim, E. (2007) Naval Institute Guide to Combat Fleets of the World: Their Ships, Aircraft, and Systems. 15 edition. US Naval Institute Press.

External links 

 6. КОРВЕТЫ И ПАТРУЛЬНЫЕ КОРАБЛИ (FFL, PS) - ВОЕННЫЙ ПАРИТЕТ 
 Historia y Arqueologia Marítima - Prefectura 
 Halcón 
 Modernizarán este año el buque escuela de Prefectura
 El guardacostas “Mantilla” de la Prefectura Naval Argentina - RiaNet 
 Mantilla class - Helicopter Database

 
Patrol vessels of Argentina
Ships built in Spain
Patrol ship classes